Shinobu Hashimoto (Hashimoto Shinobu; 18 April 1918 – 19 July 2018) was a Japanese screenwriter, film director and producer. A frequent collaborator of Akira Kurosawa, he wrote the scripts for such internationally acclaimed films as Rashomon and Seven Samurai.

Early life 
Shinobu Hashimoto was born in the Hyogo Prefecture of Japan on 18 April 1918. In 1938 he enlisted in the army, but became ill with tuberculosis while still training and spent four years in a veterans' sanitarium.

Career 
While hospitalized, another patient gave Hashimoto a film magazine. The magazine sparked his interest in screenwriting and he began a screenplay about his army experience, spending three years on the project.

Hashimoto was a frequent collaborator with Akira Kurosawa, from 1950 to 1970 writing eight screenplays Kurosawa directed. He often worked with Hideo Oguni, Ryūzō Kikushima as well as Kurosawa himself on the scripts for those projects. Hashimoto won numerous awards for his writing, including a succession of Blue Ribbon Awards and Mainichi Film Awards, particularly in the 1950s and 1960s. Hashimoto wrote more than eighty screenplays, including Rashomon, Ikiru, Seven Samurai (1950), Throne of Blood (a 1957 adaptation of Macbeth set in Japan), and The Hidden Fortress (1958). He also directed three films.

Achieving international acclaim, Hashimoto's scripts inspired notable films abroad, including The Magnificent Seven (1960 and then remade again in 2016), a remake of Seven Samurai, and Star Wars (1977), which George Lucas has described as inspired by The Hidden Fortress.

In 2006, he authored a memoir entitled Compound Cinematics: Akira Kurosawa and I. In 2008, Hashimoto wrote a screenplay for I Want to Be a Shellfish, a second full-length film adaptation of the post-World War II-based television series he wrote for Tokyo Broadcasting System Television in 1958.

Later life and death 
Hashimoto turned 100 in April 2018. He died in Tokyo on 19 July 2018 at the age of 100. In a tribute article for TIME magazine, film director Antoine Fuqua expressed his respect for Hashimoto as a screenwriter stating: "(Hashimoto's) … working with Akira Kurosawa and Hideo Oguni, was so beautiful and poetic and powerful and heartbreaking. It was all about justice, it was all about sacrifice, and it made me want to be one of those guys".

Awards and honors
 1950: Blue Ribbon Award for Best Screenplay for Rashomon
 1952: Mainichi Film Award for Best Screenplay for Ikiru
 1956: Mainichi Film Award for Best Screenplay for Mahiru no ankoku
 1956: Blue Ribbon Awards for Best Screenplay for Mahiru no ankoku
 1958: Mainichi Film Award for Best Screenplay for Summer Clouds, Stakeout and Night Drum
 1958: Blue Ribbon Awards for Best Screenplay for Summer Clouds and Stakeout
 1958: Kinema Junpo's Best Screenwriter Award for The Hidden Fortress
 1960: Mainichi Film Award for Best Screenplay for Black Art Book (:ja:黒い画集)
 1962: Blue Ribbon Award for Best Screenplay for Harakiri
 1966: Mainichi Film Award for Best Screenplay for Shiroi Kyotō
 1974: Mainichi Film Award for Best Screenplay for Castle of Sand

 2015: Mainichi Film Award Special Prize for screenwriting

Filmography 

Hashimoto is credited in the making of at least 85 films.

References

External links 
 

1918 births
2018 deaths
Japanese centenarians
Japanese screenwriters
Male screenwriters
Writers from Hyōgo Prefecture
Deaths from pneumonia in Japan
Men centenarians
Imperial Japanese Army personnel